Carrington is a civil parish in the Metropolitan Borough of Trafford, Greater Manchester, England.  It contains three listed buildings that are recorded in the National Heritage List for England.  Of these, one is listed at Grade II*, the middle grade, and the others are at Grade II, the lowest grade.  The parish contains the village of Carrington and the surrounding countryside.  The listed buildings consist of a church, a house, and a farmhouse.


Key

Buildings

References

Citations

Sources

Lists of listed buildings in Greater Manchester